Boguszyniec refers to the following places in Poland:

 Boguszyniec, Greater Poland Voivodeship
 Boguszyniec, Lubusz Voivodeship